Til the Casket Drops is the fourth and final studio album by the American hip hop duo Clipse, released in the United States on December 8, 2009, by Re-Up, Star Trak and Columbia. It debuted on number 46 on the Billboard 200, selling 31,000 copies in its very first week of availability. The album received generally positive reviews from critics. It is their final project as Clipse, prior to their split and solo ventures.

Overview 
Following their critically acclaimed Hell Hath No Fury, Clipse left Jive Records. They managed to secure a new deal with Columbia Records, and proceeded to work on their new album. Prior to the release of the album, a mixtape called Road to Till the Casket Drops, was made available on December 1, 2008. They also started their own clothing line named "Play Cloths".

The album was released on December 8, 2009. The album's cover art work was designed by the artist Kaws. Featured guests include Kanye West, Keri Hilson, Pharrell, Cam'ron, Ab-Liva and Yo Gotti. For the first time, Clipse reached out for producers other than The Neptunes. Producers for the album also Sean C and LV, DJ Khalil and Chin Injeti.

This is the final Clipse album, prior to their split in 2010. Pusha T would go on to embark a successful solo career with Kanye West's G.O.O.D. Music, while Malice would go on to convert to Christianity. He would later change his stage name to No Malice, and drop his solo debut Hear Ye Him in 2013.

Singles 
A promotional single, "Kinda Like a Big Deal" was released for the album. It features Kanye West. Three official singles were released:  "I'm Good" featuring Pharrell of The Neptunes, followed by "All Eyes on Me" featuring Keri Hilson and "Popular Demand (Popeyes)" featuring the New York rapper Cam'ron.

Critical reception

Til The Casket Drops was met with generally positive reviews. At Metacritic, the album received an average of 64 which indicated "generally favorable reviews".

Andy Kellman of AllMusic noted "There’s plenty of dazzling wordplay related to coke dealing and showing off, but the album carries a more redemptive tone and a higher level of self-awareness". Pitchfork editor Ian Cohen gave the album a score of 6.2, stating "Til the Casket Drops awkwardly vacillates between confidence and complacency, between sneering at perceived competition and smarting at perceived and possibly self-made slights". NME editor Emily Mackay criticized the album saying "since their last opus sold so poorly, they are chasing dollar here with a Neptunes assisted move toward big, slick choonage". NME gave the album a score of 3.5 stars out of 5. However, Entertainment Weekly received the album well with a score of A−, saying "Til the Casket Drops might not be quite as spellbinding as their last one, but they’re still operating on a level of cleverness that few of their peers can match". Los Angeles Times gave the album a score of 3 stars out of 4. Editor Mikael Wood wrote "On Til the Casket Drops, siblings Gene "Malice" Thornton and Terrence "Pusha T" Thornton resume their collaboration with production juggernaut the Neptunes. But this time, the Virginia duo lower their standards on a handful of songs in pursuit of the hits that eluded them the last time".

Pusha T eventually disowned the album, later stating in an interview with Elliott Wilson from Tidal in 2021 that "I hate it. I hate it. And when a song comes on, like “I’m Good,” man, this was a little bit of a bop. Hate it.“. He also added: “Only thing I love about it is the artwork, and that’s because Kaws did it. That’s it.“

Commercial performance 
The album entered the US Billboard 200 chart at number 46, and the Top R&B/Hip-Hop albums at number 9 selling 31,000 copies in its first week. The album sold 62,000 copies within the first month of being released.

Track listing

Charts

Weekly charts

Year-end charts

References

External links
 Til the Casket Drops at Metacritic

2009 albums
Clipse albums
Star Trak Entertainment albums
Albums produced by DJ Khalil
Albums produced by the Neptunes